Neodistemon is a monotypic genus of flowering plants belonging to the family Urticaceae. The only species is Neodistemon indicus.

Its native range is Indian subcontinent to Indo-China.

References

Urticaceae
Urticaceae genera
Monotypic Rosales genera